The Qurama Mountains (Uzbek: Qurama tizmasi/Қурама тизмаси) is a mountain range in Tajikistan and Uzbekistan and continues into Kyrgyzstan. The range is a water divide between Angren River to the north and the Syr Darya to the south.

See also
Kamchik Pass

References

Mountain ranges of Kyrgyzstan
Mountain ranges of Uzbekistan
Mountain ranges of Tajikistan
Mountain ranges of the Tian Shan